Banking in Germany is a highly leveraged industry, as its average leverage ratio (assets divided by net worth) as of 11 October 2008 is 52 to 1 (while, in comparison, that of France is 28 to 1 and United Kingdom is 24 to 1); its short-term liabilities are equal to 60% of the German GDP or 167% of its national debt.

History
From the 15th century, banking families such as Fugger, Welser and Hochstetter were international mercantile bankers and venture capitalists. The oldest bank still in existence in Germany, Berenberg Bank, was founded by Dutch brothers Hans and Paul Berenberg in 1590, is still owned by the Berenberg family, and is the world's oldest or second oldest bank, depending on the exact definition.

Market overview

Germany has universal banking.
The private customer mostly has to choose between three kinds of banks (German "three pillar system"):

(A) private banks (including direct banks):
the largest ones are Deutsche Bank, Postbank (acquired by Deutsche Bank), Unicredit Bank AG (HypoVereinsbank), Commerzbank and Dresdner Bank (which was acquired by Commerzbank in 2008) – they cooperate together as the Cash Group
(B) cooperative banks:
Volksbanken und Raiffeisenbanken, Sparda-Bank, DZ Bank, see German Cooperative Financial Group
(C) public banks, including local savings banks:
Sparkassen and Landesbanken, see Sparkassen-Finanzgruppe

Private banks are found mostly in the cities whereas cooperative and savings banks are almost everywhere, and are often exclusive in smaller villages.

ATM (Geldautomat) are on nearly every corner. However, customers mostly have to use their bank's ATM with their debit card if they don't want to pay a fee. Cash Group offers free ATM through the group.
Using a credit card (Visa/MasterCard/Diners Club/American Express) from a German bank in any German ATM generates a fee of about 3%. Most people prefer to use their EC/Maestro debit card.
Many physical payments are still made in cash, but increasingly, Germans are using their EC/Maestro.
Online payments are done mostly either with direct debit (Lastschrift) or with credit card.

Most of the banks offer a free main account (Girokonto) as long as the customer deposits a minimum amount regularly (> €1000 income each month).

See also
Economy of Germany
List of banks in Germany

References

Further reading
 Born, Karl Erich. International Banking in the 19th and 20th Centuries (St Martin's, 1983) online
Cable, J. "Capital Market Information and Industrial Performance: The Role of West German Banks" (1985) 95 Economic Journal, p. 118+